Black conservatism is a political and social philosophy rooted in communities of African descent that aligns largely with the conservative ideology around the world. Black conservatives emphasize traditionalism, patriotism, self-sufficiency, and strong cultural and social conservatism within the context of the black church. In the United States it is often, but not exclusively, associated with the Republican Party.

The Reconstruction era began the greatest shift of conservative African Americans in American politics in modern history. During the Reconstruction era, black voters began to align themselves more with the Republican party and its conservative ideologies. Under Franklin D. Roosevelt's administration, during his first two terms, there was not a single piece of civil rights legislation that was made into law and in the following election the black vote became more split. In 1960, the Kennedy-Johnson campaign promoted civil rights as a central issue and during their administration, they passed anti-discrimination legislation, gaining the black vote. Since then, the Democratic Party has held a majority of the black votes in America, although Pew Research Center polling has found that the percentage of African-Americans who identify as Democratic has declined in recent years, from 75% during Barack Obama's presidency to 67% in 2020. However, a 2017 sample size of 10,245 voters concluded that just 8% of African-Americans identify as Republican.

Overview
Russian anarchist Pyotr Kropotkin brought many questions of the possibility of being black and being conservative when he mocked their ability to be genuine. He explained his belief that conservatism has underlying themes of racism so black conservatives are "a freak of nature" and those who take advantage of conservatism for their own personal gain are opportunists and complicit in the oppression of their own people.

Black conservatism is particularly difficult to define because it will either not be representative of all black conservatives or it will be something that can be said of other conservatives outside of the black community. One of the main characteristics of black conservatism is its emphasis on personal responsibility and traditionalism. Black conservatives may find common ground with black nationalists through their common belief in black empowerment and the theory that black people have been duped by the welfare state. For many black conservatives, the singular objective is to bring social redemption and economic success to the black community.

Worldwide

Africa 

In the Post–Cold War era, a number of avowedly conservative parties have developed in most African countries. In countries where the population is divided by religion (i.e., Nigeria), conservative parties are often formed and constituted to target specific religions in their areas of greatest political dominance, although some have argued that many African political parties lack the same kind of ideological conflict that is common in Western countries.

Historically, differences in political platforms in Africa sometimes depended on outside influence from either the West, Cuba or the former Soviet Union as a result of proxy conflicts during the Cold War period where militant factions of political parties received economic support from either America or Soviet aligned states. During the Cold War, some African political parties which adhered to Marxism-Leninism or Maoism when participating in anti-colonial activities later adopted economic, social and culturally conservative policies upon their country gaining independence and as democracy in African states crystallized, as well as in response to growing factional opposition to communism. An example of a formerly left-wing and now conservative party is UNITA in Angola, which under the leadership of Jonas Savimbi began as a far-left, Maoist inspired movement before embracing a right-wing platform and aligning itself with the West in the 1980s. Since transforming itself into a democratic political party, UNITA is presently considered to be conservative and right-leaning. Similarly, Kenya's first Prime Minister and later President Jomo Kenyatta was reportedly sympathetic or interested in socialism and communism prior to coming to power, but upon Kenya's independence from Britain he and his Kenya African National Union party adopted conservative beliefs, including stressing the importance of individual rights and according to historian Wunyabari O. Maloba, "sought to project capitalism as an African ideology, and communism (or socialism) as alien and dangerous."

Until 1980, Liberia was largely dominated by True Whig Party whose policies and namesake were initially influenced by that of the United States Whig Party. In 2017, the recently established right-wing conservative Jubilee Party of Kenya went on to gain a majority in the election held that year and became the ruling party of Kenya.

Canada

Notable black conservatives in Canada include Senator Anne Cools and Senator Donald Oliver, both of whom serve in the Senate of Canada. Senator Oliver is a member of the Conservative Party of Canada, while Cools is a non-aligned Senator recognized as voting mainly with the Conservative caucus. Lincoln Alexander was Canada's first black MP, and served as a Federal Member of Parliament between 1968 and 1980 in the riding of Hamilton West. Former Alberta MLA's Lindsay Blackett and George Rogers (Alberta politician) and Alberta MLA Kaycee Madu are members of the Conservative Party.  Kaycee Madu made history in 2020 when he became the first black Minister of Justice and Solicitor General in Canadian history. Madu inaugurated the Association of Black Conservatives in Canada in February 2020. Dr. Akolisa Ufodike is the founder and  the inaugural National Chair.

In 2018, 3 black members of Coalition Avenir Québec were elected to the National Assembly of Quebec; Nadine Girault, Samuel Poulin and Christopher Skeete.

In 2018, Belinda Karahalios became the first black Progressive Conservative member of the Legislative Assembly of Ontario.

In 2019, Audrey Gordon became one of the first black members of the Legislative Assembly of Manitoba.

In 2020, lawyer and politician Leslyn Lewis announced her candidacy in the 2020 Conservative Party of Canada leadership election, becoming the first ethnic minority figure to run for the leadership of the Conservatives.

Europe
In Western Europe, a number of black figures have become visible in centre-right and right-wing conservative parties in official roles or as elected representatives in recent years.

Notable examples in Germany include Charles M. Huber who in 2013, became the first of two black MPs elected to the German Bundestag during the 2013 federal elections representing the CDU. In Belgium, journalist and social activist Assita Kanko was elected to the European Parliament for the conservative and Flemish nationalist N-VA party in 2019.

In 2018, Toni Iwobi became Italy's first black Senator representing the right-wing Lega Nord party and helped to draft some of the Lega's policies for the 2018 Italian general election.

Israel
Following the emigration of Ethiopian Jews, Falash Mura and Jews of African descent to Israel and their assimilation into local Israeli culture, many have become more visible in politics as elected Members of The Knesset (MKs), including within the conservative Likud party. Notable black Likud MKs have included Alali Adamso, Avraham Neguise and Gadi Yevarkan.

United Kingdom
The Conservative Party were critical of immigration from the Commonwealth during the 1950s and 1960s, culminating in the infamous Rivers of Blood speech delivered by leading Conservative MP Enoch Powell. Despite this, there have long been a small number of black conservatives. In recent years, the Conservatives have attempted to cultivate more of a following amongst the black community. Compared to the United States, the racial divide in the United Kingdom is less pronounced along party lines, due to the difference in racial relations.

Although black communities in the UK had traditionally supported Labour, in part due to anti-immigration rhetoric used by the Tories, the Conservatives began to actively circulate advertisements aimed at black voters under Margaret Thatcher ahead of the 1983 United Kingdom general election, with themes revolving around equal opportunities, better representation in the police and economic prosperity. Black British political consultant and writer Anita Boateng argued that black voters began to take more notice of the Conservative Party in the 1980s and 90s due to their messages based on faith, family values, discipline and aspiration.

Most, although not all, black Conservatives in the United Kingdom are of African origin, with either one or both parents originating from Africa and emigrating to the UK, rather than from the Caribbean or elsewhere. When the Conservative made efforts to recruit parliamentary candidates given the almost total absence of black members, they found almost all sympathetic blacks were of African heritage. Several were 'parachuted' into safe seats during the Cameron leadership era, despite some opposition from local members. In 2019, the Conservatives changed tactics to focus on promoting candidates based on talent rather than race to avoid accusations of tokenism. Black British Conservative MPs currently serving in the House of Commons are Adam Afriyie, Kwasi Kwarteng, James Cleverly, Kemi Badenoch, Darren Henry, Bim Afolami and solicitor and businesswoman Helen Grant. In the 2019 United Kingdom general election, the Conservatives fielded a record number of 76 black and ethnic minority candidates, a 72% increase on the 2017 election.

Ahead of the 2021 London mayoral election, the Conservatives selected former youth worker and journalist Shaun Bailey as their candidate.

Conservative MP  Kemi Badenoch was a candidate during the July 2022 Conservative Party leadership election.

The eurosceptic UK Independence Party has selected a number of ethnic minority and black candidates to stand for office including Winston McKenzie, London Assembly member David Kurten, and MEP Steven Woolfe. Television chef Rustie Lee was also selected, but later renounced her support.

Other notable black conservatives in the United Kingdom include education reformer and writer Katharine Birbalsingh, who described her views as being "small c conservative – a social conservative", according to BBC News, and commentators Calvin Robinson and Inaya Folarin Iman.

United States

Black conservatism in the United States is a political and social movement that aligns largely with the American conservative movement. During slavery, there was a divide between free blacks and slaves. As black people were released from slavery, they assimilated to white American culture in order to maintain a place in the social order. This is where characteristics of contemporary black conservatism began to develop. The argument behind this was the idea that if black people follow the rules of White America, then there will be no choice but to accept them into the social system. Since the Civil Rights Movement in the latter 20th century, the African-American community has generally swung to the left of the right-wing conservative movement, and has predominantly favored itself on the side of liberalism. Black conservatism emphasizes traditionalism, strong patriotism, capitalism, free markets, and opposition to abortion and gay marriage in the context of the black church.

In the post civil rights-era there was a push for continuous assimilation and, as a result, some black individuals aligned themselves with the conservative movement and accepted the idea of a color-blind society. In his book, The Content of Our Character, Shelby Steele offers an interpretation of the color-blind society ideology and why people should accept it. He claims that during slavery, black individuals were forced to cling to their black identities in order to build community and have since mistakenly clung to that same rhetoric under the impression that it is still the most valuable tool to excel. He argues that this is dangerous because it frames black individuals as victims and "pulls [blacks] into war-like defensiveness at a time where there is more opportunity for development than ever before." The idea was that if black individuals ceased to see themselves as victims of oppressive forces, then they could be seen as equals to their white counterparts. According to Steele, who grew up in a segregated society and experienced considerable racism, but who nevertheless criticized certain later policies as associating blackness with permanent inferiority: "I believe that freedom of the individual — as opposed to good works or "social justice" — is by far the highest goal any society can strive for. ... I became conservative when I realized that the era of protest was over. We blacks won everything we could win through protest — but it was an idea of what others must do for us, of how others must be moral and tolerant. Conservatism is the road ahead because it is an idea of what we can do for ourselves."

Condoleezza Rice and Colin Powell were also two prominent politicians of the Republican Party, serving as members of the highest-ranking members of the federal Executive Branch and becoming the first African-American Secretaries of State. In his 1996 retirement speech before the Republican National Convention, General Colin Powell stated that, "My sister and I were taught to believe in ourselves. We might be considered poor, but we were rich in spirit. ... We were taught by my parents to always, always, always believe in America. Ineffective government, excessive government, wasteful government, that is the kind of government that we Republicans intend to defeat. The Republican Party ... must always be the party of inclusion. The Hispanic immigrant who became a citizen yesterday must be as precious to us as a Mayflower descendant; the descendant of a slave or of a struggling miner in Appalachia must be as welcome — and must find as much appeal — in our party as in any other party or any other American might. It is our diversity that has made us strong. ... I have been asked many times why I became a Republican. I became a Republican because like you, I believe our party best represents the principles of freedom, opportunity, and limited government upon which our nation was founded. ... These are the things that remain constant. These are the things that unite us. There are other eternal truths, other eternal constants in our lives. A country that exists by the grace of a divine providence. A divine providence that gave us this land, told us to be good stewards of it and to be good stewards of each other. A land that God has truly, truly blessed and that we are proud to call America."

Some elected black conservatives include Florida representative Allen West, U.S. Senator Tim Scott of South Carolina, former Oklahoma representative J.C. Watts, and former Connecticut representative Gary Franks. Other notable black conservatives include economist Thomas Sowell, former Secretary of State Condoleezza Rice, perennial political candidate Alan Keyes, and Supreme Court justice Clarence Thomas. In 2009, Michael Steele became the first black man to chair the Republican National Committee. In 2011, Herman Cain was considered the leading Republican presidential nominee for a period of time. In addition there are a number of up and coming voices in the arena of political talks shows, and guest analysts such as Dr. Carol Swain, professor of political science from Vanderbilt University with multiple appearances on CNN, Fox News, PBS, C-SPAN, and ABC Headline News.

More recently, Dr. Ben Carson, (Benjamin Solomon Carson Sr.) a renowned African-American author and neurosurgeon, announced his candidacy for the 2016 Republican nomination in his hometown Detroit in May 2015, but ultimately lost the nomination to Donald Trump, officially ending his campaign in March 2016. After Trump won the 2016 Presidential election, Carson was offered the role of United States Secretary of Housing and Urban Development, which he at first rejected but ultimately accepted, and was officially confirmed by the U.S. Senate as Secretary in a 58–41 vote the same month.

Kanye West, a critically acclaimed African-American rapper, songwriter and husband of fellow celebrity Kim Kardashian, has on several occasions publicly expressed support for President Trump, stating once that had he voted he would have voted for Trump in the election; he also expressed his approval of millennial conservative commentator Candace Owens. West stated his intention to run for President at the 2020 presidential election; under the Birthday Party banner, his name appeared on the ballot in 12 states and won 60,000 votes. He subsequently conceded defeat, but tweeted "Kanye 2024", signalling a potential run at the 2024 presidential election. Glenn Loury at Brown University and John McWhorter at Columbia University are two African-American conservatives who frequently broadcast analyses on the web about current events related to racism. Loury is slightly more conservative than McWhorter, and has implied that he will vote for Trump in 2020. Both question institutional racism, which McWhorter calls a religion, and believe that African American leaders should embrace personal responsibility to a greater extent than they are currently.

Black conservative ideologies

Color-blind America
The colorblind America argument is one that often comes up in conservative discourse. It is the idea the decisions and legislation are made without regard to racial identity (cite). Black conservatives assert that, because there has been a post-civil rights era push in the conservative movement to rally behind this colorblind conservative ideology, that it actually hinders the black community's progress to oppose it. They claim that by refusing to recognize this discourse, black individuals are not focusing on racial development. This partially explains the opposition to affirmative action amongst black conservatives. They claim that this type of government intervention in black mobility actually does more to question the ability of black individuals to succeed than it does to provide well-earned opportunities that would otherwise be inaccessible.

Individualism
Individualism is where individuals are personally responsible for pursuing success in their own self-interest. Black conservatives are in favor of individualism and oppose government interventions such as affirmative action because they do not want it to raise the question of whether or not they deserve the successes they have achieved or if they took part in what some refer to as "reverse racism". Black conservatives oppose policies such as affirmative action that were created with the intention of creating opportunity for minorities who have been historically oppressed in the United States. Black conservatives justify this because they are opposed to any policy that may be perceived by Whites as an unearned benefit or a handout. Clarence Thomas described affirmative action as problematic because it reinforces stereotypes of black individuals being inferior. He claimed it leads to personal doubt and stifles individuality.

Christian evangelism
Historian Gregory Schneider identifies several constants in American conservatism: respect for tradition, support of republicanism, "the rule of law and the Christian religion", and a defense of "Western civilization from the challenges of modernist culture and totalitarian governments." Black conservatives are motivated by two of the values of general conservative thought, for the love of God and country. The black church specifically is linked to Christian evangelism, and a dependence on God and his plans. These plans are part of what allow black conservatives to get behind the ideas of individualism that conservatism is built on. Though it may seem antithetical to reconcile the history of slavery and segregation with the ideas of complete American freedom and equality, it is actually the hope of reaching that goal without having to depend on their oppressors that makes individualism appealing to some people in the black community.

According to a 2014 Pew Research Center poll, African-Americans today are generally found to be more likely to identify as Christian and Protestant than whites, Latinos in the United States, with 79% of black Americans identifying as Christian compared to 77% of Latinos and 70% of white Americans.

Social issues
Similarly to white and Hispanic Americans, African-American stances on social issues can sometimes be influenced by religious beliefs as well. According to a 2017 Pew Research Center poll, 44% of black Protestants supported gay marriage, compared with 67% of Catholics and 68% of "white mainline Protestants". In another Pew poll conducted around the same time, black Protestants are also sharply divided on the issue of abortion, with a slight majority of 55% saying it should be legal in most or all cases, and 44% believing it should be illegal.

Notable black conservatives in politics

 Lincoln Alexander
 Adam Afriyie
 Kemi Badenoch 
 Shaun Bailey
 Lindsay Blackett
 Katharine Birbalsingh
 Ken Blackwell
 Deneen Borelli
 Herman Cain
 Daniel Cameron
 Lionel Carmant
 Ben Carson
 Ernest Chénière
 David Clarke
 Diamond and Silk
 Anne Cools
 Stanley Crouch
 James Cleverly 
 Byron Donalds
 Christian Dubé
 Larry Elder
 Ignacio Garriga
 Nadine Girault
 Audrey Gordon
 Wesley Hunt
 Will Hurd
 Zora Neale Hurston
 Darren Henry
 Inaya Folarin Iman
 Niger Innis
 Toni Iwobi
 Kay Coles James
 John E. James
 Assita Kanko
 Belinda Karahalios
 Jomo Kenyatta
 Uhuru Kenyatta
 Alan Keyes
 Alveda King
 Angela Stanton-King
 Kimberly Klacik
 Akolisa Ufodike
 Kwasi Kwarteng 
 Leslyn Lewis
 Mia Love
 Kaycee Madu
 Don Meredith
 Kenneth Meshoe
 Lucette Michaux-Chevry
 Ossufo Momade
 Isaiah Montgomery
 Deroy Murdock
 Donald Oliver
 Burgess Owens
 Candace Owens
 Star Parker
 Charles Payne
 Marie-Luce Penchard
 Jesse Lee Peterson
 Maxette Grisoni-Pirbakas
 Maurice Ponga
 Samuel Poulin
 Colin Powell 
 Condoleezza Rice
 Arthur Richards
 Gabriel Mithá Ribeiro
 Calvin Robinson
 Mark Robinson
 George Rogers
 Isaías Samakuva
 George Schuyler
 Tim Scott
 Winsome Sears
 Christopher Skeete
 Kiron Skinner
 Michael Steele
 Shelby Steele
 Carol Swain
 Lynn Swann
 Clarence Thomas
 Michael Thompson
 William Tubman
 Dick Ukeiwé
 João Varela
 Herschel Walker
 Booker T. Washington
 J. C. Watts
 Allen West
 Jason Whitlock
 Armstrong Williams
 Rama Yade

See also

List of African American Republicans
Hip Hop Republican
Black leftism
Black capitalism

References

Sources
 
 

Conservatism
Conservatism in Africa
Conservatism in the United States